The Loro Boriçi Stadium, previously known as Vojo Kushi Stadium is a multi-purpose stadium in Shkodër, Albania, which is used mostly for football matches and is the home ground of Vllaznia. The stadium has a capacity of around 16,000 seated.

History
On 17 May 1950, the construction of the stadium started and on 1 May 1952, the stadium was inaugurated and was named after Vojo Kushi, who was an Albanian partisan, hero of Albania. In 1990, during the fall of communism in Albania, the stadium was renamed in honour of football coach and former player Loro Boriçi (1922–1984). Between 2015 and 2016 the stadium was rebuilt into a modern all-seater stadium with a capacity of 16,022. The stadium is also the second largest stadium in Albania behind the Qemal Stafa Stadium in Tirana.

2015 Reconstruction
The stadium was last renovated in 2001. In October 2014, the Prime Minister of Albania, Edi Rama announced the reconstruction of the stadium. On 3 May 2015, the construction work officially started, bringing the stadium to a renewed capacity of 18,100.

International matches

Albania
On 29 March 2003, it hosted a UEFA Euro 2004 qualifying match of Albania against Russia and finished with a 3–1 win.

Kosovo
After stadiums in Mitrovica and Pristina were under renovation and do not meet UEFA standards. Kosovo played the qualifying matches of the 2018 FIFA World Cup in Loro Boriçi Stadium. On 6 October 2016, it hosted the first qualifying match of Kosovo against Croatia and finished with a 0–6 biggest defeat.

Notes and references

Notes

References

External links

 
 Loro Boriçi Stadium at EU-Football.info

Sport in Shkodër
Multi-purpose stadiums
Multi-purpose stadiums in Albania
Buildings and structures in Shkodër
Football venues in Albania
KF Vllaznia Shkodër